Bridgeport, Connecticut, held an election election for mayor on November 5, 2019. It saw the reelection of incumbent mayor and former 2018 Guberbatorial candidate Joseph Ganim.

Nominations
Primaries were held on September 10.

Democratic primary
Voter turnout in the Democratic primary was under 20%.

Democratic incumbent Joseph Ganim narrowly won renomination over state senator Marilyn Moore. Moore had won the votes cast on election day, but her lead was surmounted by Ganim once absentee ballots were counted.
  
Moore had filed a lawsuit alleging that there were "irregularities and illegal conduct" surrounding absentee ballots and requesting a judge order a re-do of the primary election.

Republican primary
Voter turnout in the Republican primary was roughly 14%.

General election results

References

2019
Bridgeport
Bridgeport